"Do You Believe in Magic" is the twelfth episode of the eighth season of the American sitcom Modern Family, and the series' 178th episode overall. It aired on American Broadcasting Company (ABC) in the United States on February 8, 2017. The episode was written by Jon Pollack, and directed by Gail Mancuso.

Plot summary
Claire decides to hire a magician who could help her and Phil bring some mystery on Valentine's Day. Cam and Mitch teach Haley and Sal (Elizabeth Banks) to stand up against their men with unexpected results. As Jay has developed the habit to prefer Joe over Manny, Alex discovers that Ben, Claire's assistant, has a crush on her.

Reception

Ratings
In its original U.S. broadcast, "Do You Believe in Magic" was watched by 7.34 million people; down by 0.73 from the previous episode.

Reviews
Kyle Fowle of The A.V. Club gave episode a B+, saying "“Do You Believe In Magic” isn’t a perfect episode, but it does hit a rewarding sweet spot between saccharine and hilarious."

References

External links
 

2017 American television episodes
Modern Family (season 8) episodes
Valentine's Day television episodes